Parabel may refer to:
Parabel (river), a river in Tomsk Oblast, Russia
Parabel (rural locality), a rural locality (a selo) in Parabelsky District of Tomsk Oblast, Russia